Mir Damad (c. 1561 – 1631/1632), known also as Mir Mohammad Baqer Esterabadi, or Asterabadi, was a Twelver Shia Iranian philosopher in the Neoplatonizing Islamic Peripatetic traditions of Avicenna. He also was a Suhrawardi, a scholar of the traditional Islamic sciences, and foremost figure (together with his student Mulla Sadra) of the cultural renaissance of Iran undertaken under the Safavid dynasty. He was also the central founder of the School of Isfahan, noted by his students and admirers as the Third Teacher (mu'alim al-thalith) after Aristotle and al-Farabi.

Philosophy
His major contribution to Islamic philosophy was his novel formulation regarding gradations of time and the emanations of the separate categories of time as descending divine hypostases. He resolved the controversy of the createdness or uncreatedness of the world in time by proposing the notion of huduth-e-dahri (atemporal origination) as an explanation grounded in Avicennan and Suhrawardian categories, whilst transcending them. In brief, excepting God, he argued all things, including the earth and all heavenly bodies, share in both eternal and temporal origination. He influenced the revival of al-falsafa al-yamani (Philosophy of Yemen), a philosophy based on revelation and sayings of prophets rather than the rationalism of the Greeks, and he is widely recognized as the founder of the School of Isfahan, which embraced a theosophical outlook known as hikmat-i ilahi (divine wisdom).

Mir Damad’s many treatises on Islamic philosophy include Taqwim al-Iman (Calendars of Faith, a treasure on creation and divine knowledge), the Kitab Qabasat al-Ilahiyah (Book of the Divine Embers of Fiery Kindling), wherein he lays out his concept of atemporal origination, Kitab al-Jadhawat and Sirat al-Mustaqim. He also wrote poetry under the pseudonym of Ishraq (Illumination). He also wrote a couple of books on mathematics, but with secondary importance.

Among his many other students besides Mulla Sadra were Seyyed Ahmad-ibn-Reyn-al-A’bedin Alavi, Mohammad ibn Alireza ibn Agajanii, Qutb-al-Din Mohammad Ashkevari and Mulla Shams Gilani.

Mir Damad's philosophical prose is often accounted as being among the most dense and obtusely difficult of styles to understand, deliberately employing as well as coining convoluted philosophical terminology and neologisms that require systematic unpacking and detailed commentary.
He was called Mir Damad (Groom of the King) because he married Shah Abbas's daughter and hence his fame was based on that event.

Architecture
Mir Damad was also the architect of the Masjide Shah (Shah Mosque) in Isfahan which employed highly advanced mathematical calculations which required the knowledge of the speed of sound at that time. The geometry of the dome is as such that all sound dissipated from the base will echo in hundreds of carefully calculated and masterly executed interior corners of the dome which will ultimately collide in the center of the dome. The geometrical analysis of the dome is of absolute sophistication and the design of the dome is a magnificent piece of art and furthermore the construction of such dome in the 17th century to a precision where all sound waves must travel and collide in an imaginary point above.

Family 
His son was Seyed Ali Naghi Astarabadi and his grandson was Sayyid Mahdi bin Sayyid Ali Naqi. His daughter was the wife of Sayyid Ahmad ibn Zayn al-Abidin Alavi.

The man has not been seen: Seyyed Ali Naqi Ibn Al-Seyyed Al-Musa (father of three sons: Seyyed Kamal Hassanzadeh Hafshjani, Seyyed Musa Hassanzadeh Hafshjani, Seyyed Mohammad Hafshjani and three daughters: Seyyed Ala Ala Begum Hassanzadeh Esther Shamsabadi, who had a special reputation): Mirza Nasrollah  Karimian, Mirza Assadollah Karimian, Mirza Ali Karimian, Mirza Mehdi Karimian (father of musician Kaveh Karimian), Mirza Reza Karimian, Mirza Jalal Karimian, Mirza Hassan (father of Dr. Milad Karimian), Mirza Taghi Karimian, Seyedeh Tajzadeh Astarabad, Seyedeh Aghabazadeh, Hassanzadeh family).

Male result: Sayyid Hassan bin Al-Sayyid Mahdi

Works
Among his 134 works known:

Taqwim al-Iman (Calendars of Faith)
Kitab Qabasat al-Ilahiyah (Book of the Divine Embers of Fiery Kindling)
Kitab al-Jadhawat (Book of Spiritual Attractions)
Sirat al-Mustaqim (The Straight Path)

See also
Islamic scholars
List of Iranian scholars
Sayyid Husayn Ahlati

References

Further reading
 Ian Richard Netton (2013). Encyclopedia of Islamic Civilization and Religion. Routledge, Oxon, UK. .
 Encyclopædia Iranica: Mir Damad.
 Webster Encyclopedia of Religion.

External links
 Islamic Philosophy Online

16th-century Iranian philosophers
Iranian inventors
Islamic philosophers
17th-century Iranian philosophers
1630s deaths
17th-century writers of Safavid Iran
People from Gorgan
Safavid theologians
16th-century writers of Safavid Iran